Campino is a variety of hard candy made by August Storck KG. It is made using a combination of yogurt and fruits which have varied since the product's launch in 1966. Up until 2007 only two varieties were available; strawberry and summer fruits (a mixed bag of raspberry, blackcurrant, and peach), however strawberry, cherry, and peach are also available. They have been discontinued in the UK, but are available in the United States and Canada.

See also
 List of confectionery brands

References

August Storck brands
German confectionery